The Pensacola Opera is an American opera company located in Pensacola, Florida. Founded in 1983, the company presents an annual season of opera at the Saenger Theatre.

References

External links
Official website of the Pensacola Opera

American opera companies
Musical groups established in 1983
Culture of Pensacola, Florida
1983 establishments in Florida